Gracius Joseph Broinowski (7 March 1837 – 11 April 1913) was a Polish-Australian artist and ornithologist.  He was born at the village of Walichnowy in central Poland, the son of a landowner and military officer.  He studied languages, classics and art at Munich University.  In about 1857 he joined the crew of a windjammer bound for Australia, leaving the ship at Portland, Victoria.

Broinowski spent the next few years doing various jobs, including working for a publisher in Melbourne, selling and promoting his paintings, and travelling widely in eastern Australia.  He married Jane Smith, the daughter of a whaling captain, in about 1863.  In 1880 he settled in Sydney, teaching painting, lecturing on art and holding exhibitions of his own work.

In the 1880s he began to publish illustrated works on Australian natural history.  First came "The Birds and Mammals of Australia", followed in 1888 by "The Cockatoos and Nestors of Australia and New Zealand", and "The Birds of Australia" in 1891.

Broinowski died at Mosman in Sydney, survived by his wife, six sons and a daughter. One son, Leopold, became a significant political journalist in Tasmania. A great grandson, Richard Broinowski was an Australian public servant and diplomat.

References

External links
Works by Gracius Broinowski in the Biodiversity Heritage Library

1837 births
1913 deaths
Australian bird artists
Australian ornithologists
Polish emigrants to Australia
19th-century Australian painters
20th-century Australian painters